Masquerades (مسخرة) is a 2008 Algerian/French film directed by Lyes Salem.

Synopsis 
A village in Algiers. Proud and a bluffer, Mounir wishes to be admired by all, but he has a weakness: His sister, Rym, who falls asleep anywhere. One night on the way back from the city, and quite inebriated, he shouts out to all and sunder that a rich businessman has asked for his sister's hand. By the next morning, he's the envy of all. Trapped by his own lie, Mounir changes his family's destiny.

Cast
 Mounir (Lyes Salem) - Habiba's husband, and Rym's older brother
 Rym (Sarah Reguieg) - Mounir's sister and object of Khliffa's affection
 Khliffa (Mohamed Bouchaïb) - Mounir's best friend, in love with Rym
 Habiba (Rym Takoucht) - Mounir's wife
 Amine (Merouane Zmirli) - Mounir and Habiba's boy
 Rédouane Lamouchi (Mourad Khan) - businessman and conman

Production

Masquerades is an Algerian-French co-production, directed by Lyes Salem.

Awards 
 Fespaco 2009 (Burkina Faso)
 Festival Francophone de Namur 2008 (Belgium)
 Festival Francophone d’Angoulême 2008 (France)
 Dubai International Film Festival 2008

References

External links
 

2008 films
Algerian drama films
French drama films
2000s French films